Peter Gillman (born 1942) is a British writer and journalist specializing (but not exclusively) in mountaineering topics. His book, Direttissima; the Eiger Assault (1967), also published under the title Direttissima, co-authored with Dougal Haston, told the story of the ascent of the Eiger North Face  in which John Harlin II lost his life.

Early life and education
Gillman attended Hawes Down school, Dulwich College (1953–61), and University College Oxford (1961–64). He was editor of Isis magazine at Oxford.

Career

He became a journalist on leaving Oxford and was soon writing for the Sunday Times, first as a freelancer, and then as a staff member, where he spent five years on the newspaper's Insight team. He became a freelance journalist in 1983 and has written for most British newspapers.  He specializes in mountain writing with his wife and writing partner Leni Gillman. Their 2000 book, The Wildest Dream, is a biography of the Everest climber George Mallory.  The Gillmans' 2015 book, Extreme Eiger, is an account of an ascent of the North Face of the Eiger in 1965.

Works

Books

Selected articles

References

British male journalists
Living people
1942 births